The 2021 Biella Challenger Indoor was a professional tennis tournament played on hard courts. It was the 1st edition of the tournament which was part of the 2021 ATP Challenger Tour. It took place in Biella, Italy between 8 and 14 February 2021.

Singles main-draw entrants

Seeds

 1 Rankings are as of 1 February 2021.

Other entrants
The following players received wildcards into the singles main draw:
  Adrian Andreev
  Andy Murray
  Luca Vanni

The following players received entry from the qualifying draw:
  Giovanni Fonio
  Fabrizio Ornago
  Jelle Sels
  Tim van Rijthoven

Champions

Singles

 Illya Marchenko def.  Andy Murray 6–2, 6–4.

Doubles

 Luis David Martínez /  David Vega Hernández def.  Szymon Walków /  Jan Zieliński 6–4, 3–6, [10–8].

References

2021 ATP Challenger Tour
2021 in Italian tennis
February 2021 sports events in Italy
Biella Challenger Indoor